The 2013 Cup of China was the third event of six in the 2013–14 ISU Grand Prix of Figure Skating, a senior-level international invitational competition series. It was held at the Capital Indoor Stadium in Beijing on November 1–3. Medals were awarded in the disciplines of men's singles, ladies' singles, pair skating, and ice dancing. Skaters earned points toward qualifying for the 2013–14 Grand Prix Final.

Entries

Changes to preliminary assignments
Polina Korobeynikova withdrew and was replaced by Nikol Gosviani. Geng Bingwa withdrew and was replaced by Guo Xiaowen. Kevin Reynolds also withdrew; he was not replaced.

Results

Men

Ladies

Pairs

Ice dancing

References

External links
 2013 Cup of China

2013 in figure skating
Cup of China
2013 in Chinese sport
Sports competitions in Beijing
2010s in Beijing